The Tajikistan Futsal Cup, is the top knockout tournament of Tajikistan futsal and the second most important futsal competition in Tajikistan after the Tajikistan Futsal League. It is organized by the Tajikistan Football Federation and was established in the 2013 season.

Cup winners 
 2013: DISI Invest Dushanbe
 2014: Dinamo Dushanbe
 2015-16: DISI Invest Dushanbe
 2016-2017: DISI Invest Dushanbe

League Cup winners 
 2018: Sipar Khujand

Super Cup winners 
 2013: DISI Invest Dushanbe
 2014: Natsbank Dushanbe

See also 
 Tajikistan Futsal League
 AFC Futsal club championship
 Tajikistan Football Federation
 Tajikistan national futsal team

References

External links 
 Tajikistan Futsal

Futsal in Tajikistan
National futsal cups
Recurring sporting events established in 2013
2013 establishments in Tajikistan